Laila Majnu  is a 1962 Indian Malayalam-language romance film, directed by P. Bhaskaran, based on Layla and Majnun. Starring Prem Nazir and L. Vijayalakshmi, with Sathyan, Thikkurissi, T. S. Muthiah, Chandni, Adoor Bhasi and Kodungalloor Ammini Amma in supporting roles, the film's acclaimed music was composed by Baburaj. Egyptian dancer Laila appeared in one of the songs.

Cast 
 Prem Nazir as Qais
 L. Vijayalakshmi as Laila
 Thikkurissi as Sarvari
 T. S. Muthaiah as Amir Ameeri
 Sathyan as Baqthum
 Chandni as Zareena
 Adoor Bhasi
 Master Radhakrishnan
 Sobha
 Bahadoor
 Shantha
 Baby Vilasini
 S. A. Jameel
 Kochappan
 Kodungalloor Ammini Amma

Soundtrack 
The music was composed by M. S. Baburaj and lyrics were written by P. Bhaskaran.

References

External links 
 
http://www.malayalachalachithram.com/movie.php?i=102

1962 films
1960s Malayalam-language films
1960s romance films
Films directed by P. Bhaskaran
Indian romance films